Lake Rotokākahi or Green Lake, is one of four small lakes lying between Lake Rotorua and Lake Tarawera in the Bay of Plenty Region of New Zealand's North Island. The others are Lake Tikitapu (Blue Lake), Lake Okareka, and Lake Okataina. All lie within the Okataina caldera, along its western edge.

From the air the lake looks emerald green due to its shallow, sandy bottom. The lake is 394 metres above sea level and 24 metres below the level of the neighbouring Lake Tikitapu.

The lake remains under the authority of Te Arawa iwi, Tūhourangi, and remains largely undisturbed as it is considered to be  (sacred).

Motutawa
This small island in the lake is notable as the site of the 1822 slaughter of a part of Ngāpuhi, that led to the revenge raid of Hongi Hika in 1823—and also as the resting place of the bones of Hinemoa.

References

External links

Lakes of the Bay of Plenty Region
Okataina Volcanic Centre
Volcanic crater lakes
Taupō Volcanic Zone